Vinh station is one of the main railway stations on the North–South railway (Reunification Express) in Vietnam. It serves the city of Vinh.

Vinh
Railway stations in Vietnam
Buildings and structures in Nghệ An province